Darrell Bryant is a retired NASCAR Winston Cup Series driver whose claim to fame was his two "top ten" finishes in addition to racing 2389 laps - for a distance of . Bryant has driver for Chevrolet, Dodge, Oldsmobile, and Mercury during his driving career.

Career
His average start was 24th place while his average finish is 25th. Earning only $14,075 in total race winnings ($ when inflation is taken into effect), Bryant would not become one of the multimillionaires that are present in today's NASCAR. Wade Younts, Curtis Crider, and Buddy Arrington were a few of the people who employed Darrell during his NASCAR Grand National Series career. Bryant's ultimate retirement from motorsports as a driver came on September 6, 1976 when he finished an agonizing 40th place the 1976 Southern 500 in Darlington, South Carolina driving for former NASCAR team owner Cliff Stewart.

He would later become a crew chief and lead drivers like Terry Labonte and Lake Speed to race victories during the 1980s. Bryant's most recent NASCAR-related job was being the crew chief of the late Tony Roper during the 2000 NASCAR Busch Series season. After Roper died from a severe neck injury sustained from a racing crash in his No. 50 Chevrolet Monte Carlo machine, Bryant has never worked in NASCAR ever again.

References

External links

1940 births
Living people
NASCAR crew chiefs
NASCAR drivers
People from Thomasville, North Carolina
Racing drivers from North Carolina